Elena Dami (born 4 January 1999) is an Italian curler from Buttigliera, Italy. She is currently the alternate on the Italian National Women's Curling Team skipped by Stefania Constantini.

Career
Dami joined the Italian National Women's Curling Team, skipped by Veronica Zappone, for the 2018–19 season. The team represented Italy at the 2018 European Curling Championships where they finished in last place with a 2–7 record. Later that season, she played lead on the Italian junior team that represented Italy at the 2019 Winter Universiade. There, the team once again finished in last with a 2–7 record.

The next season, Dami aged out of juniors and was moved to alternate on the Italian National Team. The team competed in the 2019 European Curling Championships B Division after being relegated due to their 2018 performance. After finishing second in the round robin, they defeated Hungary in the semifinals and Turkey in the final to claim the B Division title. This earned them a spot at the 2020 World Qualification Event for the chance to qualify Italy for the 2020 World Women's Curling Championship. At the Qualification Event, they finished second in the round robin with a 6–1 record. They then lost to Korea in the first qualification game before bouncing back to defeat Turkey in the second place game to claim the thirteenth and final spot at the World Women's Championship. The Worlds were cancelled due to the COVID-19 pandemic. The team represented Italy at the 2021 World Women's Curling Championship. The Italian team was originally not supposed to compete in the 2021 championship, but due to the cancellation of qualification events as well as the change in the Olympic Qualification Process, they were added as the fourteenth team. At the World Championships, the team finished in thirteenth place with a 2–11 record, their wins coming against Estonia and Germany.

Personal life
Dami is currently a student.

Teams

References

External links

Living people
1999 births
Italian female curlers
Sportspeople from the Province of Asti